Pallanchathanur is a small village in Palakkad district, Kerala, India.

References

Villages in Palakkad district